In Roman mythology, Deverra (apparently from Latin deverro "to sweep away") was one of the three gods that protected midwives and women in labor, the other two being Pilumnus and Intercidona. Symbolised by a broom used to sweep away evil influences, she ruled over the brooms used to purify temples in preparation for various worship services, sacrifices and celebrations.

See also
 List of Roman birth and childhood deities

References 
Google Books - The Cult of Silvanus: A Study in Roman Folk Religion

Roman goddesses
Childhood goddesses